The Men's 800 metres T53 event at the 2012 Summer Paralympics took place at the London Olympic Stadium from 4 to 5 September.

Records
Prior to the competition, the existing World and Paralympic records were as follows:

Results

Round 1
Competed 4 September 2012 from 12:54. Qual. rule: first 3 in each heat (Q) plus the 2 fastest other times (q) qualified.

Heat 1

Heat 2

Final
Competed 5 September 2012 at 19:43.

 
Q = qualified by place. q = qualified by time. PB = Personal Best. SB = Seasonal Best.

References

Athletics at the 2012 Summer Paralympics
2012 in men's athletics